Sungam Ni Airport is an airport in Sŭngam-rodongjagu, Kyongsong-gun, Hamgyong-bukto, North Korea.

Facilities 
The airfield has a single asphalt runway 14/32 measuring 2950 x 190 feet (899 x 58 m).  It is sited along the east coast of North Korea.

References 

Airports in North Korea
North Hamgyong